Lapshyn is a village in Ternopil Raion of Ternopil Oblast, Ukraine. It belongs to Naraiv rural hromada, one of the hromadas of Ukraine.  

Until 18 July 2020, Lapshyn belonged to Berezhany Raion. The raion was abolished in July 2020 as part of the administrative reform of Ukraine, which reduced the number of raions of Ternopil Oblast to three. The area of Berezhany Raion was merged into Ternopil Raion.
Edward Rydz-Śmigły Marshal of Poland, was born here.

Population
Population in 2001: 1152 inhabitants with over 366 houses.

Gallery

References

Notes

Sources

External links
Official data about the village  

Villages in Ternopil Raion